Marat Rashidovich Sagirov (born 1 April 1986) is a Russian former professional football player.

Club career
He played in the Russian Football National League for FC KAMAZ Naberezhnye Chelny in the 2011–12 season.

External links
 
 

1986 births
Footballers from Kazan
Living people
Russian footballers
Association football midfielders
FC Tyumen players
FC KAMAZ Naberezhnye Chelny players
FC Luch Vladivostok players
FC Tekstilshchik Ivanovo players
FC Lada-Tolyatti players
FC Rubin Kazan players
FC Neftekhimik Nizhnekamsk players